Piesmus submarginatus is a species of beetle in the family Carabidae, the only species in the genus Piesmus.

Their habitat is under dead pine bark in mesophilous forests.

References

Pterostichinae